Harold Perrineau (born August 7, 1963) is an American actor best known for his roles as Michael Dawson in the ABC television series Lost (2004–2010), Augustus Hill in the HBO television series Oz (1997–2003), Sheriff Boyd Stevens in the Epix television series From (since 2022), Link in The Matrix Reloaded and The Matrix Revolutions (both 2003), and Mercutio in Baz Luhrmann's Romeo + Juliet (1996).  He has also starred in the films  Smoke (1995), for which was nominated for the Independent Spirit Award for Best Supporting Male, The Edge (1997), The Best Man (1999), Woman on Top (2000), and 28 Weeks Later (2007). His other television credits include Sons of Anarchy (2012), Constantine (2014–2015), Claws (2017–2022), and The Rookie (2019–2021).

Early life 
Perrineau was born in Brooklyn, New York City. His parents changed his name to Williams when he was a child, but he later changed it back, after discovering there was already a Harold Williams in the Screen Actors Guild. He attended Shenandoah University and Alvin Ailey American Dance Theater.
Harold has 4 brothers; Anthony, Bryan, Lance and Malik.

Career 
In 1989, Perrineau was cast as the original Tyrone Jackson in the world premiere of the stage adaptation of the 1980 hit movie Fame (now known as Fame: The Musical) at the Walnut Street Theatre, in Philadelphia, Pennsylvania. He took the role of Link in The Matrix series after the original operator Tank was written out of the script when Marcus Chong was fired over monetary disputes. Lost co-star Adewale Akinnuoye-Agbaje starred with Perrineau on the HBO series Oz.

Perrineau played Michael Dawson on ABC's hit show Lost. He was temporarily written off when his character left the island with his son at the end of season two and did not appear in season three. In July 2007, it was announced he would return to the main cast for the show's fourth season. However, the return was short-lived, as the fourth season was his last as a regular cast member. He made one guest appearance in the sixth and final season.

Perrineau starred in 30 Days of Night: Dark Days with Rhys Coiro, Mia Kirshner, Kiele Sanchez, Diora Baird and Monique Ganderton. Perrineau appeared in the 2008 music video "Yes We Can".

Perrineau voiced the title character from Marvel's Blade anime series on G4 January 2012. He was cast to play the character of Damon Pope, the main antagonist of season 5 of the hit show Sons of Anarchy.

Perrineau starred as Stevie, the bass player, in the TBS comedy Wedding Band, which ran from 2012 to 2013.

Perrineau starred as Manny, an angelic messenger, in Constantine, the short-lived 2015 television series based on the DC Comics/Vertigo character John Constantine.

He made his Broadway debut in the Roundabout Theatre Company production of Anton Chekov's The Cherry Orchard, adapted by Stephen Karam. The play ran from September 2016 to December 4, 2016. Perrineau played Lopakhin, with Diane Lane as Ranevskaya. Also in 2016, Perrineau co-starred in the Amazon Studios legal series Goliath.

From 2017 to 2022, Perrineau played Dean, a man on the autism spectrum and the brother of Desna, in TNT's Claws. He won the award for Outstanding Supporting Actor in a Drama Series at the NAACP Awards. Perrineau starred as a cop, Nick Armstrong, on The Rookie for most of season 2 and as a guest on season 3.

Since his debut single "Stay Strong" in 2007 Perrineau has been working on his musical career. He is actively collaborating with music producer Tomo in der Muhlen, known as DJ Tomo Tom Tom, on his debut album, Seeker. The first single, "Moving On", was released October 15, 2011. Perrineau enjoys doing live shows where he performs with a full band: two guitars, bass, drums and keyboards. He performed at Los Angeles club The Mint in April 2010. Perrineau has appeared in MKTO's "Thank You" music video and J. Cole's "She Knows" music video.

Personal life 
Perrineau has been married to Brittany Robinson, a former actress and model, since 2002. They have three daughters, including actress Aurora.

Filmography

Film

Television

Video games

Awards and nominations

References

External links 

 
 
 
 Official website

1963 births
20th-century American male actors
21st-century American male actors
African-American male actors
American male film actors
American male stage actors
American male television actors
American male video game actors
American male voice actors
Living people
Male actors from New York City
People from Brooklyn
20th-century African-American people
21st-century African-American people